Ensemble/HCC is an island platformed METRORail light rail station in Houston, Texas, United States. The station was opened on January 1, 2004, and is operated by the Metropolitan Transit Authority of Harris County, Texas (METRO). Located Midtown, this station is close to both the Houston Community College System's Central College campus and The Ensemble Theatre, which together give the station its name. 

The station was to have originally been called Berry/HCC due to its location at the intersection of Main and Berry Streets near the Houston Community College Central Campus. However, Ensemble/HCC was chosen as the official name after Houston mayor Lee P. Brown presented a proposal from The Ensemble Theatre to include their name in the station naming. This is the only station to have its name altered from the original ones proposed by METRO.

References

METRORail stations
Railway stations in the United States opened in 2004
Railway stations in Texas at university and college campuses
Midtown, Houston
Railway stations in Harris County, Texas